Fanurio is a time tracking and billing software application developed by Fanurio Time Tracking, a company founded in 2006. It is developed in Java and it is mostly used by freelancers. The application is a "2 in 1" product allowing both time tracking and billing.

Features
 Time tracking
 Billing
 Invoices
 Reports
 Address Book integration

Integration
The applications runs on Java 1.4 or higher using Hibernate object/relational mapping with HSQLDB.

See also
 Time tracking software
 Comparison of time tracking software

References

External links
 

Time-tracking software
Business software for Linux
Proprietary software